The 2023 Galgos de Tijuana season is the Galgos de Tijuana second season in the Liga de Fútbol Americano Profesional (LFA) and their first under head coach Héctor del Águila.

Galgos opened the season with a victory, the first ever in the team's history, against Mexicas, 24–6.

Draft

Roster

Regular season

Standings

Schedule

References

2023 in American football
Galgos